Salat is a village in Kulpahar subdistrict in Uttar Pradesh, India.

Bundelkhand
Villages in Mahoba district